The Deacon John Grave House, located at 581 Boston Post Road in Madison, Connecticut, is a saltbox house that was built by Deacon John Grave in 1681. The Grave family lived in the house for 300 years. The Deacon John Grave Foundation was formed in 1983 to save the house from demolition, and converted it into a museum.

See also
List of the oldest buildings in Connecticut
Madison, Connecticut

References

Grave, John
Houses completed in 1681
1681 establishments in the Thirteen Colonies
Grave, John
Saltbox architecture in Connecticut
Connecticut Colony
Museums in New Haven County, Connecticut
Grave, John
Grave, John
Historic districts on the National Register of Historic Places in Connecticut
National Register of Historic Places in New Haven County, Connecticut